Leucodecton is a genus of lichen-forming fungi in the family Graphidaceae. The genus was circumscribed in 1860 by Swiss lichenologist Abramo Bartolommeo Massalongo, with Leucodecton compunctum assigned as the type species.

Species
Leucodecton albidulum 
Leucodecton album 
Leucodecton anamalaiense 
Leucodecton biokoense 
Leucodecton bisporum 
Leucodecton canescens  – Sri Lanka
Leucodecton compunctellum 
Leucodecton compunctum 
Leucodecton confusum 
Leucodecton coppinsii 
Leucodecton dactyliferum 
Leucodecton desquamescens 
Leucodecton elachistoteron 
Leucodecton fissurinum 
Leucodecton fuscomarginatum  – Sri Lanka
Leucodecton glaucescens 
Leucodecton granulosum 
Leucodecton inspersum 
Leucodecton isidioides 
Leucodecton minisporum 
Leucodecton nuwarense 
Leucodecton occultum 
Leucodecton oxysporum 
Leucodecton phaeosporum 
Leucodecton pseudostromaticum 
Leucodecton pustulatum 
Leucodecton sordidescens 
Leucodecton sorediiferum 
Leucodecton subcompunctum 
Leucodecton tarmuguliense 
Leucodecton uatumense 
Leucodecton willeyi

References

Graphidaceae
Lichen genera
Ostropales genera
Taxa described in 1860
Taxa named by Abramo Bartolommeo Massalongo